Team Danmark is an organization funded by the Danish government through the proceeds from Danske Spil, the state-controlled organization for betting on sports in Denmark, with the purpose of promoting elite sports in Denmark.

References

External links 
 Team Danmark website

Sports organizations of Denmark
Sport in Denmark